Pronous is a genus of South American and African orb-weaver spiders first described by Eugen von Keyserling in 1881.

Species
 it contains sixteen species:
Pronous affinis Simon, 1901 – Malaysia
Pronous beatus (O. Pickard-Cambridge, 1893) – Mexico to Costa Rica
Pronous colon Levi, 1995 – Costa Rica
Pronous felipe Levi, 1995 – Mexico
Pronous golfito Levi, 1995 – Costa Rica
Pronous intus Levi, 1995 – Costa Rica to Brazil
Pronous lancetilla Levi, 1995 – Honduras
Pronous nigripes Caporiacco, 1947 – Guyana
Pronous pance Levi, 1995 – Colombia
Pronous peje Levi, 1995 – Costa Rica, Panama
Pronous quintana Levi, 1995 – Mexico
Pronous shanus Levi, 1995 – Panama
Pronous tetralobus Simon, 1895 – Madagascar
Pronous tuberculifer Keyserling, 1881 (type) – Colombia to Argentina
Pronous valle Levi, 1995 – Colombia
Pronous wixoides (Chamberlin & Ivie, 1936) – Panama, Colombia, Ecuador

References

Araneidae
Araneomorphae genera
Spiders of Asia
Spiders of Madagascar
Spiders of North America
Spiders of South America
Taxa named by Eugen von Keyserling